Barak (also Romanized as Barāk, Berak, Borāk, and Borak; also known as Parak) is a village in Pol Beh Pain Rural District, Simakan District, Jahrom County, Fars Province, Iran. At the 2006 census, its population was 308, in 68 families.

References 

Populated places in Jahrom County